Chinese Work Songs is the 13th studio album by the American rock band Little Feat, released in 2000.

Four of the album's songs are covers; of "Rag Mama Rag" by The Band, "Sample in a Jar" by Phish, "It Takes a Lot to Laugh, It Takes a Train to Cry" by Bob Dylan and "Gimme a Stone" from the concept album Largo. "Gimme a Stone" marked the only time drummer Richie Hayward sang lead vocals with the group.

Track listing
"Rag Mama Rag" (J. R. Robertson) – 4:38
"Eula" (Barrère, Tackett) – 4:26
"Bed of Roses" (Murphy, Payne) – 4:48
"Sample in a Jar" (Anastasio, Marshall) – 4:54
"Just Another Sunday" (Murphy, Payne) – 7:52
"Gimme a Stone" (Hyman, Chertoff, Forman, Bazilian) – 5:06
"Rio Esperenza" (Murphy, Payne) – 4:54
"Tattoo Heart" (Barrère, Murphy) – 6:55
"Marginal Creatures" (Barrère, Tackett) – 5:16
"Chinese Work Songs" (Payne, Tackett) – 6:27
"It Takes a Lot to Laugh, It Takes a Train to Cry" (Bob Dylan) – 6:07

Personnel

Little Feat
Paul Barrère – vocals, guitar, dobro, bicycle bells 
Sam Clayton – percussion, backing vocals
Kenny Gradney – bass, backing vocals
Richie Hayward – drums, vocals
Shaun Murphy – vocals, percussion
Bill Payne – keyboards, vocals
Fred Tackett – guitar, dobro, backing vocals

Texicali Horns
Darrell Leonard – trumpet, trombonium
Joe Sublett – saxophone

Additional personnel
Béla Fleck – banjo on Gimme A Stone
Lenny Castro – percussion
Piero Mariani – percussion

References

2000 albums
Little Feat albums
Albums produced by Bill Payne
Albums with cover art by Neon Park